Trichostema dichotomum, common name forked bluecurls, is a flowering plant in the mint family (Lamiaceae). The plant is found in the Midwestern and Eastern United States, Eastern Canada, and the Bahamas.

Description
Trichostema dichotomum is an annual herbaceous forb with opposite, simple leaves, and square, erect, hairy stems.

The flowers are blue, borne in late summer.

References

External links
USDA Plants Profile for Trichostema dichotomum (forked bluecurls)

dichotomum
Flora of Eastern Canada
Flora of the Northeastern United States
Flora of the United States
Flora of the Southeastern United States
Flora of the Bahamas
Flora of the Great Lakes region (North America)
Plants described in 1753
Taxa named by Carl Linnaeus
Flora without expected TNC conservation status